LaGrange Callaway Airport  is a public airport three miles southwest of LaGrange, in Troup County, Georgia. The FAA's National Plan of Integrated Airport Systems for 2009-2013 called it a general aviation airport.

In 1950-53 La Grange had airline flights: Southern Airways DC-3s.

Facilities
It has two asphalt runways: 13/31 is 5,600 by 150 feet (1,707 x 46 m) and 3/21 is 5,000 by 100 feet (1,524 x 30 m).

In the year ending April 30, 2008 the airport had 17,100 aircraft operations, average 46 per day: 99% general aviation and 1% military. 62 aircraft were then based at the airport: 82% single-engine, 10% multi-engine, 2% jet and 6% glider.

References

External links 
 LaGrange Callaway Airport
 LaGrange Callaway (LGC) at Georgia DOT Airport Directory
 Aerial photo as of 27 January 1993 from USGS The National Map
 

Airports in Georgia (U.S. state)
Buildings and structures in Troup County, Georgia
Transportation in Troup County, Georgia